The Chief Ladiga Trail  is a rail trail in Alabama that stretches for  from Anniston to the Alabama-Georgia state line. It is the state's first rail trail project.

History

Trail background 

The Chief Ladiga is on the same rail corridor as the Silver Comet Trail in Georgia as far as Piedmont, Alabama. From there it parallels an abandoned Southern Railway line for a few miles west of town until it leaves the old Seaboard rail line, heading south on the Norfolk Southern Railway route until the trail ends just north of Anniston. In 2008, the Ladiga and Silver Comet trail were connected. A new gateway marks the connecting point at the state line. Now that the Chief Ladiga and the Silver Comet trails are connected, there is a  paved corridor for non-motorized travel from just west of Atlanta, Georgia to Anniston, making it the 2nd longest paved trail in the U.S (the longest being the Paul Bunyan State Trail in Minnesota).

Chief Ladiga 

Chief Ladiga was a Muscogee chief who relinquished his tribe's lands when he signed the Treaty of Cusseta in 1832. The Treaty was part of a broader policy of indian removal perpetrated by the Jackson Administration. Ladiga sold half his land (which would later become Jacksonville) to speculators for $2000.

Route 
The Chief Ladiga Trail starts at the Alabama-Georgia state line. At about mile marker 7.0, the trail crosses the Pinhoti National Recreation Trail.
It travels west to Piedmont, the direction changes to southwest then on to Jacksonville and going through the Jacksonville State University campus. Then, the trail goes to Weaver and finally ending at Michael Tucker Park in north Anniston. It travels through wetlands, across streams, through forests and farmlands, and includes a horizon view of the Talladega Mountains. There are several bridges and both new and restored railroad trestles.

There is proposal to extend the trail  from Michael Tucker Park southward to 4th street in downtown Anniston.  , the City of Anniston hired an engineering firm to inspect bridges and design the  trail extension.

See also 
Silver Comet Trail
List of Hiking Trails in Alabama

References

External links 

 Chief Ladiga Trail Jacksonville State Environmental Policy Information Center (EPIC)
 Chief Ladiga Trail Map (google mashup)
 Chief Ladiga Trail RailsToTrails.us
 Chief Ladiga Trail Traillink

Protected areas of Calhoun County, Alabama
Protected areas of Cleburne County, Alabama
Long-distance trails in the United States
Rail trails in Alabama
National Recreation Trails in Alabama
Bike paths in Alabama
Hiking trails in Alabama
Anniston, Alabama